Molochny is an urban locality (an urban-type settlement) in Kolsky District of Murmansk Oblast, Russia, located on the Kola Peninsula on the lower Kola River,  south of Murmansk. Population: 

It was founded as a work settlement around 1935.

See also
Vykhodnoy
Molochna, a Ukrainian River

References

Urban-type settlements in Murmansk Oblast
Kolsky District